Technicolor is a color film process.
Technicolour (BrE) or Technicolor (AmE) may also refer to:

Music
 Technicolour (Disco Inferno album), 1996
 Technicolor (Marlango album)
 Technicolor (Parachute Band album), 2008
 Tecnicolor, a 1970 album by Brazilian band Os Mutantes
 Technicolour (rock band), a musical group from Finland
 "Life in Technicolor" / "Life in Technicolor II", songs by British rock band Coldplay
 "Technicolour" (song), song by Australian singer Montaigne
 "Technicolour", song by English singer Paloma Faith included on the single "Upside Down"

Other
 Technicolor Creative Studios, a multinational corporation that provides the visual effects, motion graphics and animation for entertainment and advertising industries
 Technicolor (physics), theories of physics beyond the Standard Model of particle physics, modeled after the quantum chromodynamics quantum field theory
 Vantiva, the technology company formerly know as Technicolor SA, when Technicolor Creative Studios was spun off.

See also 
 Technicolor for Industrial Films, a 1949 sponsored film about how Technicolor can be used in industrial films
 Technicolor Specials (Warner Bros. series), Hollywood color film shorts of the 1930s and 1940s